Seán Duignan (born 1936) is an Irish journalist, newsreader, political aide and writer. Best known for his near forty-year career with RTÉ News, Duignan also worked as press secretary to the Fianna Fáil-Labour Party government between 1992 and 1994.

References

1936 births
Living people
Alumni of the University of Galway
People from County Galway
Press secretaries
RTÉ newsreaders and journalists